Arie den Hartog (23 April 1941 – 7 June 2018) was a Dutch road bicycle racer. Den Hartog won the Milan–San Remo Classic in 1965, as well as the Amstel Gold Race in 1967.

References

External links

Profile by cyclinghalloffame.com

1941 births
2018 deaths
Dutch male cyclists
People from Bernisse
UCI Road World Championships cyclists for the Netherlands
Cyclists from South Holland
20th-century Dutch people